Hate Me may refer to:

 "Hate Me" (Ellie Goulding and Juice Wrld song), 2019
 "Hate Me" (Blue October song), 2006
 "Hate Me" (Miley Cyrus song), from the 2020 album Plastic Hearts
 "Hate Me!", a song by Children of Bodom, 2000
 "Hate Me", a song by Attila from Guilty Pleasure
 "Hate Me", a song by Lil Peep from Come Over When You're Sober, Pt. 2
 Hate Me (album) or the title song, by Escape the Fate, 2015

See also
 Hate (disambiguation)